Lung fung soup (龍鳳湯; pinyin: lóng fèng tāng), also referred to as Dragon's soup and Dragon phoenix soup, is a thick seafood or gou rou soup made with lemon, chili peppers, chicken, snake, and Chinese vegetables. Other variations could include a vegetarian version of the same with mushrooms instead of seafood. Fung comes from the use of chicken in the soup while "Lung" comes from the use of snake.

"Feng" means Phoenix in Chinese.  "Lung" or "Long" means dragon.

See also
 List of Chinese soups
 List of seafood soups
 List of soups

References

Chinese soups